Grace Brown may refer to
 Grace Brown (cyclist)  (born 1992), Australian road cyclist
 Murder of Grace Brown (1886–1906), American factory worker whose life inspired characters in several novels